Zee 24 Kalak is an Indian Gujarati-language news channel launched on 20 August 2017, it is owned by Zee Media, a subsidiary of Essel Group.

Zee 24 Kalak now is free-to-air from Dish TV platform which can be received by DD Free dish viewers.

See also
List of Gujarati-language television channels 
Zee Entertainment Enterprises

References

External links
 
 Zee 24 Kalak on Zee5

24-hour television news channels in India
Television channels and stations established in 2017
Television stations in Ahmedabad
Gujarati-language television channels in India
Essel Group
Zee Entertainment Enterprises